Songshan is a railway and metro station in Taipei, Taiwan, served by Taiwan Railways and Taipei Metro. This station connects to the shopping centre at basement 1 and level 1. The station is a planned transfer for the Circular line.

Station overview

Songshan Station became the principle south-bound origin and north-bound terminus for the Western Trunk line starting in 1986, after the reconstruction of Taipei Main Station began in 1985. These functions were moved to Qidu in Keelung shortly before the reconstruction. The former Songshan Station was at-grade and operated by the TRA. It opened as a temporary station in July 2003 as part of the Taipei Railway Underground Project. All railway lines and platforms have been moved underground (from at-grade) since 21 September 2008 in a move to improve safety and area development. A  tunnel was constructed between this station and neighboring Nangang Station at a cost of NT$76.5 billion.

The current station building opened for service in 2008. Built by Ruentex Development Company, the new station building was constructed via a NT$3.3 billion build-operate-transfer (BOT) contract. The Taiwan Railways Administration section consists of two island platforms (four tracks), while the Taipei Metro station has an island platform and five exits. They are connected via an underground passage.

The new Taipei Metro station has a "Halo of City" theme with an egg-shaped hall and columns forming a ring structure. It has six exits, four vent shafts, and two accessibility elevators. The north side of the station is land for a joint development project.

Public art
The Taipei Metro station features a theme of "Festivities of Light" to reflect the mix of traditional and modern culture, local religion, and administration. It enhances the night activity in the area.

Bicycle Accessibility
Songshan Station is 0 kilometer starting point for the Taiwan Cycling Route No. 1, and the station features a bicycle accessibility stair ramp.

History
The area around Songshan Station was originally part of a vast field which was maintained for deer hunting.

On 20 October 1891, it was opened as "Sekkhao Train Wharf".

It was upgraded to a second-class train station on 1 January 1955. Songshan Airport Line stopped operating on 1976 and freight services ceased on 15 August 1985. The new station building opened on 15 July 1986 and on 1 July 1987, it became a first-class train station. Freight cargo services were shifted to Nangang on 20 September 1991. The station moved underground on 21 September 2008 and the temporary station was present from 28 July 2003 to 29 December 2009.

On 15 November 2014, the Songshan Line terminus opened for service.

An explosion occurred at the station before midnight on 7 July 2016. A broken metal tube filled with explosive material was found on the scene, but a cause has not yet been determined.

Station layout

Around the Station

 Songshan Market (next to the station)
 Raohe Street Night Market (50m to the north)
 Nangang Sports Center (200m to the east)
 Rainbow Bridge (300m to the northwest)
 Wufenpu Park (300m to the south)
 Wuchang Park (350m to the southwest)
 Wufenpu Shopping District (400m to the south)
 Houshanpi metro station (550m to the southeast)
 Nansong Market (600m to the west)
 Yongji Market (650m to the south)
 Yongchun Market (700m to the south)
 Yongji Park (800m to the south)
 Yongchun Park (850m to the south)
 Chengmei Left Bank Riverside Park (1km to the northeast)
 Yongchun metro station (1km to the south)

See also
 List of railway stations in Taiwan

References

External links
TRA Songshan Station
Taiwan Railways Administration
TRTC Route Map & Timetables

Railway stations served by Taiwan Railways Administration
Railway stations in Taipei
Railway stations opened in 1891
Songshan–Xindian line stations
1891 establishments in Taiwan